Autochloris crinopoda is a moth of the subfamily Arctiinae and its class is Insecta. It was described by William James Kaye in 1918. It was described from Cayenne in French Guiana.

References

Arctiinae
Moths described in 1918
Moths of South America